Lu Chao (born October 9, 1988) is a Chinese baseball pitcher who plays with the Guangdong Leopards in the China Baseball League. 

Chao represented China at the 2017 World Baseball Classic.

References

1988 births
Living people
2017 World Baseball Classic players
Chinese baseball players
Baseball pitchers
Guangdong Leopards players